Sokoni Tacuma Karanja (Lathan Johnson) (born January 7, 1940 in Topeka, Kansas) is a child development expert, and President and CEO of the Center for New Horizons.

He graduated from Topeka High School in 1958, from Washburn University with a B.A. in 1961, from the University of Denver with a master's degree in psychology, from Atlanta University with a master's degree in social work, from the University of Cincinnati with a master's degree in community planning, and from Brandeis University with a Ph.D. degree in urban policy, where he was assistant dean of students, in 1971.

He was on the board of Woods Fund of Chicago.
In 2004, he was arrested by police, but the charges were dismissed. 
He is married to professor Ayana Karanja; they have five children.

Awards
 1993 MacArthur Fellows Program

References

External links
"Video Oral History Interview with Sokoni Karanja", History Makers, January 7, 2005

Living people
1940 births
People from Topeka, Kansas
Washburn University alumni
University of Denver alumni
University of Cincinnati alumni
Brandeis University faculty
Brandeis University alumni
MacArthur Fellows
Developmental psychologists
Clark Atlanta University alumni